Kibaale is a town in the Western Region of Uganda. It is the main municipal, administrative, and commercial center of Kibaale District, and the district headquarters are located there.

Location
The coordinates of the town are:0°47'28.0"N, 31°04'30.0"E (Latitude: 0.791100; Longitude: 31.075003).

Population
The 2002 national census estimated the population of Kibaale at 4,800. In 2010, the population had grown to 7,200, as estimated by the Uganda Bureau of Statistics (UBOS). In 2011, UBOS estimated the population at 7,600.

Points of interest
The following points of interest lie within the town limits or close to its edges:
 Headquarters of Kibaale District Administration
 Offices of Kibaale Town Council
 Kibaale central market
 Mobile branch of PostBank Uganda

See also
Kagadi
Bunyoro sub-region
ICCF Holland

References

External links
  Kibaale Town Council to Build UShs 500 Million Taxi Park

Populated places in Western Region, Uganda
Cities in the Great Rift Valley
Kibaale District
Bunyoro sub-region